Vaughan & Bushnell Manufacturing, also known as Vaughan Manufacturing and branded as simply Vaughan, is an American manufacturing company that specializes in the production of hammers, axes, prybars, and hand saws. The company produces more than 250 different kinds of hammers.

History 

Vaughan was founded in 1869 in Chicago, Illinois by Alexander Vaughan, an 18-year-old blacksmith, as a plumbing business. Vaughan soon set up a blacksmith shop behind a hardware store in Chicago owned by Sidney Bushnell. On June 15, 1869, Vaughan was granted a patent for an improved post auger and began producing custom tools.

In 1871, much of the company was destroyed in the Great Chicago Fire, and Bushnell invested additional funds for the company, which was incorporated in 1882 as the Vaughan and Bushnell Manufacturing Company. The company began shifting its focus to hammers, hatchets, axes, and wrecking bars.

In 1922, the Bushnell family's interests in the company were bought out by the Vaughan family. In 1963, company's headquarters were relocated to Hebron, Illinois. In 1993, the company became the first striking tool manufacturer to receive ISO 9002 certification.

Gallery

References

External links 
Vaughan Manufacturing web site

Striking tool manufacturers
Manufacturing companies based in Illinois
Companies established in 1869
Companies based in McHenry County, Illinois
1869 establishments in Illinois
Tool manufacturing companies of the United States